Castellana is a neighborhood (barrio) of Madrid belonging to the district of Salamanca. It is 0.77323 km² in size.

References 

Wards of Madrid
Salamanca (Madrid)